David Sharp (born July 16, 1941) is a former American cyclist. He competed in the tandem event at the 1960 Summer Olympics.

References

External links
 

1941 births
Living people
American male cyclists
Olympic cyclists of the United States
Cyclists at the 1960 Summer Olympics
Sportspeople from Indianapolis
Cyclists from Indiana